Gaup is a surname. Notable people with the surname include:

Ailo Gaup (author) (1944–2014), Norwegian author and shaman
Ailo Gaup (motocross rider) (born 1979), Norwegian motocross rider
Ingor Ánte Áilo Gaup (born 1960), Norwegian actor, composer, and folk musician
Johanne Gaup (born 1950), Norwegian politician
Mikkel Gaup (born 1968), Norwegian film and stage actor
Nils Gaup (born 1955), Norwegian film director

Sami-language surnames